The Gerster's Independent Company of Pioneers was an independent company of military engineers that served in the Union Army during the American Civil War.

The Company was organized in St. Louis, Missouri organized under the authority of Major General John C. Frémont. The unit was organized by Captain Anton Gerster, a professional engineer and a veteran of the 1848-48 Hungarian War of Independence. The company was intended to provide engineering and pioneer support to the Army of the West operating at that time in the state of Missouri.

Service
Attached to Army of the West and Unattached District of Southwest Missouri, Dept. of Missouri, to September, 1862. Fremont's Campaign against Springfield, Mo., September to November, 1861. Duty at Jefferson City, Rolla and Springfield, Mo., until December 29, 1861. Advance to Springfield, Mo., and the Southwest December 29, 1861, to February 14, 1862. Duty in District of Southwest Missouri until September, 1862.

On March 8, 1862, Special Orders No. 43 of the Adjutant General of Missouri ordered Gerster's Independent Company of Pioneers consolidated with other units to form the 5th Missouri Volunteer Infantry.

On December 18, 1862, Captain Gerster's company, now known as Company "H", 5th Missouri Volunteer Infantry, was reassigned, becoming Company "H", 27th Missouri Volunteer Infantry. The history of Gerster's company merges with the 27th Missouri from this point.

The members of the company remaining in the 27th Missouri Volunteer Infantry were mustered out on May 15, 1865.

Commanders
 Captain Anton Gerster
 1st Lt John Kies
 1st Lt Gottlieb Bumgart 
 2nd Lt William E. Ware
 2nd Lt Thomas F. Haskell

See also
Missouri Civil War Union units

External links
 Article from the Missouri Civil War Museum discussing ethnic Hungarians in Missouri state units. The article discusses Captain Anton Gerster and his company's service.

Notes and references

 Dyer, Frederick H. A Compendium of the War of the Rebellion (Des Moines, IA:  Dyer Pub. Co.), 1908.
 

Units and formations of the Union Army from Missouri
Military units and formations established in 1861
1861 establishments in Missouri
Military units and formations disestablished in 1862
Engineer units and formations of the Union Army